Cuba-Guatemala relations refers to the bilateral relations between Republic of Cuba and Guatemala. Both nations are members of the Association of Caribbean States, Community of Latin American and Caribbean States, Organization of Ibero-American States and the United Nations. Cuba has a embassy in Guatemala City and Guatemala has a embassy in Havana.

History

In the 1960s, Cuba established close ties with the emerging Guatemalan social movement led by Luis Augusto Turcios Lima, and supported the establishment of the URNG, a militant organization which later evolved to become a legal political party following the end of the Guatemalan Civil War. Guatemala severed ties with Cuba from the 1960s until the end of the civil war in 1998. 
In 1999, Guatemalan President Alvaro Arzu visited Cuba.

In 2009, Guatemalan President Alvaro Colom visited Havana and gave Fidel Castro the Order of Quetzal, one of the highest honors in Guatemala. Cuban president Raul Castro accepted the award on behalf of his brother, Fidel.

Medical aid
Cuba provided over 40,000 eye surgeries and 27 million medical consultations to Guatemalans between 1998 and 2009.

Trade
In FY2020, Guatemala exported US$8.86 Million worth of goods to Cuba while Cuba exported US$389,000 worth of goods to Guatemala. Guatemala's most common export to Cuba was cleaning products while Cuba's most common export to Guatemala was Coal Brisquettes.

See also
 Foreign relations of Cuba
 Foreign relations of Guatemala

References 

 
Guatemala
Cuba